Čadraže (in older sources also Čadreže) is a village on the right bank of the Krka River in the Municipality of Šentjernej in southeastern Slovenia. The area is part of the traditional region of Lower Carniola. It is now included in the Southeast Slovenia Statistical Region.

The local church, built on top of a Hallstatt period tumulus on the western outskirts of the settlement, is dedicated to Saint Ulrich and belongs to the Parish of Šentjernej. It is a medieval structure that was greatly rebuilt in the Baroque style in the 17th century.

References

External links
Čadraže on Geopedia

Populated places in the Municipality of Šentjernej